Taras Zinoviyovych Yuryk (Ukrainian: Тарас Зіновійович Юрик; born in 9 December 1980), is a Ukrainian politician who had served as a Member of Parliament in the Verkhovna Rada of the 8th convocation, as a member of the then Petro Poroshenko Bloc party. He was a Member of the MDO "Deputy Control".

Biography

Taras Yuryk was born on 9 December 1980.

Between 2001 and 2002, he was the head of the legal department of "Bolear MED" in Ternopil.

In 2002, he graduated from the Ternopil Academy of National Economy (now Ternopil National University of Economics).

From 2002 to 2003, he was a legal advisor of the Ternopil branch of JSC "Ukrinbank", and from 2003 to 2004, he was a senior legal advisor.

In February to May 2005, he was the acting head of the legal department of the Ternopil branch of TAS-Komertsbank JSC. Until 2006, he was the head of the legal department.

Since 2005, he is a member and co-founder of the Ternopil Regional Organization "Regional Investment Research Fund".

From 2006 to 2010, he was the head of the Ternopil branch of JSC "Transbank", Western regional branch.

From 2010 to 2011, he was deputy director of the Western Regional Directorate (head of the Ternopil branch) of Evrogazbank JSC.

In 2014, he was a member of the Supervisory Board of Protection Group LLC.

Politics

Yuryk was a candidate for the Verkhovna Rada from the Petro Poroshenko Bloc in Zboriv single-mandate electoral district No. 165. Based on the results of the vote, he becomes a member of parliament, a People's Deputy of Ukraine.

On 29 December 2014, the draft law No. 1677 "On Amendments to the Law of Ukraine "On Copyright and Related Rights" (regarding freedom of panorama)" was registered in the Verkhovna Rada of Ukraine on the submission Yuryk. The developer of the project is the NGO "Wikimedia Ukraine"

He was a member of the Supervisory Board of Ternopil State Medical University named after I. Ya. Horbachevsky.

Since February 2017, he is the head of the public union "Football Federation of Ternopil Oblast", and from 22 November 2019 the public union "Football Association of Ternopil Oblast".

Family

His wife is  Maryana Tomyak, who is a journalist of the INTB TV channel.

References

1980 births
Living people
Eighth convocation members of the Verkhovna Rada